Maner also spelled Maner Sharif, is a Block and satellite town in Patna Metropolitan Region. It is part of the Patna district in the Indian state of Bihar. Maner Sharif  lies 24 km west of Patna, the capital of Bihar on NH-922. The town has tombs of Sufi saints Makhdoom Yahya Maneri and Makhdoom Shah Daulat, known as Bari Dargah (the great shrine) and Chhoti Dargah (the small shrine). 

Maner  is an important tourist area and tourism centre. The city's name is said to come from its status as a center of tourism. Haldi Chhapra in Maner is the Sangam (meeting point) where Sone River meets Ganga. From here it flows as Ganga towards Patna.

Famous Bhojpuri actor Kunal Singh hails from Maner. Bollywood actor Ramayan Tiwari was born and brought up in Maner.

History
Makhdoom Shah Daulat died in Maner Sharif in 1608 and Ibrahim Khan Kakar Governor of Bihar, built a mausoleum to him that was completed in 1616.

The domed mausoleum's walls are adorned with intricate designs and its ceiling has passages from the Qur'an. Maner Sharif also has a mosque constructed by Ibrahim Khan (governor of Bihar) in 1619. Maner Sharif was a regional centre of learning and is where the Sanskrit grammarian Pāṇini studied.

Maner ka Laddu 

Maner is known for its variant of laddu known as Motichoor Laddu made with ghee and promoted by local vendors as being made using the sugar-sweet waters of the Sone river. Maner laddu featured in the Bollywood movie Khudgarz.

Maner Sweets is the oldest and most famous sweet shop which makes authentic Maner ka Laddoo (Laddu). Aamir Khan visited this place while travelling via this route for movie promotion.

In addition of Maner's laddu and Dargah sharif, Maner also has Buddhist temple, Jain temple  and significances of other religions, hence, it is the emblem of unity diversity.

Demographics
 India census, Maner had a population of 2,99,585, consisting of 53% male and 47% female citizens. Maner has an average literacy rate of 52%, lower than the national average of 59.5%: male literacy is 61%, and female literacy is 42%. In Maner, 19% of the population is under 6 years of age.

Languages

Politics

Srikant Nirala of RJD won the Maner seat (assembly constituency no. 192) defeating Sacchidanand Rai of JD(U) in October 2005 and February 2005. Bhai Birendra of SAP defeated Srikant Nirala of RJD in 2000. Srikant Nirala representing Janata Dal defeated Bhai Birendra (Independent) in 1995. Srikant Nirala representing Congress defeated Suryadeo Tyagi of Janata Dal in 1990. Rajmati devi representing Congress defeated Suryadeo Tyagi representing LKD in 1985. Ram Nagina Singh (Independent) defeated Suryadeo Tyagi of Janata Party (SC) in 1980. Suryadeo Tyagi representing Janata Party defeated Ram Nagina Singh representing Congress in 1977. Currently, Bhai Birendra of RJD serving as the MLA of Maner constituency.

Geography

List of villages
The list of villages in Maner Block (under Danapur Tehsil) is as follows:
 Baluwa
 Bank
 Biyapur
 Darwesh Pur North
 Darwesh Pur South
 Gyaspur
 Hulasi Tola
 Haldi chapra
 Hathi tola
 Islam Gunj
 Khaspur
 Kita Chauhattar East
 Kita Chauhattar Middle
 Kita Chauhattar West
 Madhopur
 Magarpal
 Prem Tola
 RamBad
 Rampur Diyara Tauffir
 Ratan Tola
 Sadikpur
 Sarai
 Sherpur East
 Sherpur West
 Singhara
 Suwarmarwah
 76
 84

References

External links
Dargah Maner Sharif
Government of Bihar
Bihar Tourism

Indian Sufis
Patna district
Tourist attractions in Patna district
Neighbourhoods in Patna

 Education :-

 * Ram Nagina singh Inter College
 * +2High school Maner
 * Topper classes maner(TCM)
 * Prakash high school Maner
 * Girls high school maner